Niu is a Chinese family name was listed 310th on the Song Dynasty list of the Hundred Family Surnames. It means "ox". According to a 2013 study it was the 103rd most common surname at the time, shared by 2.20 million people, or 0.150% of the total population, with the province with the most being Henan.

Prominent people with family name 牛 
 Consort Niu (牛昭容), a concubine said to be a power behind the throne after Tang emperor Shunzong suffered a stroke.
 Niu Ben (牛犇), stage name of Chinese actor Zhang Xuejing.
 Niu Fu (牛辅), general during the late Han Dynasty and Three Kingdoms period.
 Niu Guannan (牛冠男), Chinese water polo player.
 Niu Huijun (牛惠君), international football referee.
 Niu Jianfeng (牛剑锋), Chinese bronze medallist in table tennis at the 2004 Athens Olympics.
 Niu Junfeng (牛骏峰), Chinese actor.
 Niu Jin (牛金), general during the late Han Dynasty and Three Kingdoms period.
 Niu Lijie (牛丽杰), former Chinese women's national football team member.
 Rong Niu or Red Panda (born 1970/1971), Chinese American acrobat
 Niu Sengru (牛僧孺), chancellor for Tang emperors Muzong, Jingzong and Wenzong.
 Niu Weiyu (牛畏予), Chinese photojournalist and head of the Xinhua News Agency.
 Niu Xianke (牛仙客), chancellor for Tang emperor Xuanzong.
 Niu Yingzhen, poet 
 Niu Zhiyuan (牛志远), Chinese sport shooter who competed in the 2000 Summer Olympics.
 Niu Zhizhong (牛志忠), member of China's 18th Central Committee from 2012, expelled from the Party in 2016.
 Niu Zhuang (牛壮), Chinese former professional snooker player.
 Thomas Niu Huiqing (牛会卿), Chinese Catholic bishop.
 Yuh-Line Niou (牛毓琳), New York State Assembly member
 Zhisheng Niu (牛志升), electrical engineering professor.
Niu Chiao
Niu Lizhi

See also

Chinese-language surnames
Individual Chinese surnames